LeFrak is a surname. Notable people with the surname include:

Richard LeFrak (born 1945), American real estate tycoon, son of Samuel
Samuel J. LeFrak (1918–2003), American real estate tycoon

See also
LeFrak City
LeFrak-Moelis Records